Nalanda Walk is an annual event organised by Nalanda College, Colombo Old Boys Union.

It is paraded by Vintage Cars and limousines, Hummer, other super luxury cars, decorated Elephants, floats, Mounted horses,  Bands,  Drummers, open double deckers and many cultural items together with the  principal, teachers, Old boys of different ages and invited school children from other schools.

This year too in 2014 "Nalanda Walk" took place on a grand scale attended by alumni Mahinda Rajapaksa, Nimal Siripala de Silva, Rajitha Senaratne, Chandima Weerakkody & Thilanga Sumathipala.

References

Sources
 
 
 
 
 
 
 Nalanda 90th Anniversary Walk - 8 November 2014
 President at his Alma–mater’s walk 2014

Nalanda College, Colombo
Alumni of Nalanda College, Colombo
Annual events in Colombo